The Dominican Republic Fed Cup team represents the Dominican Republic in Fed Cup tennis competition and are governed by the Federación Dominicana de Tenis.  They currently compete in the Americas Zone Group II.

History
Dominican Republic competed in its first Fed Cup in 1990.  Their best result was qualifying for the 32-team main draw in 1990.

See also
Fed Cup
Dominican Republic Davis Cup team

External links

Billie Jean King Cup teams
Fed Cup
Fed Cup